Hypocritanus is a genus of hoverfly found in the Neotropical region.

Species
Hypocritanus fascipennis (Wiedemann, 1830)
Hypocritanus lemur (Osten Sacken, 1877)

References

Hoverflies
Diptera of North America